Moslemuddin, also known by his aliases Rafiqul Islam Khan and Hiron Khan, was a Bangladesh Army officer who was convicted for his role in the 1975 assassination of president Sheikh Mujibur Rahman and Jail Killing. He is currently a fugitive.

1971 Bangladesh Liberation War 
Moslemuddin fought in the Bangladesh Liberation War and was awarded Bir Protik, the fourth highest gallantry award in Bangladesh. However, his award was withdrawn in 2021, along with the awards of several other soldiers involved in Sheikh Mujib's assassination.

15 August 1975 Coup
Moslemuddin was part of the group that attacked the residence of Sheikh Fazlul Haque Mani, the nephew of Sheikh Mujibur Rahman, in the 15 August 1975 Bangladesh coup d'état. He reached Bangabandhu Bhaban after killing Sheikh Fazlul Haque and met up with the other coup leaders. Major Abdul Aziz Pasha took Moslemuddin's sten gun and used it to kill Sheikh Fazilatunnesa Mujib, Sheikh Jamal, Sultana Kamal, and Jamal's wife Rosy. Haviladar Mohammad Quddus Sikder, who was on guard duty told in his court testimony that Moslemuddin and Pasha shot the family members of Sheikh Mujibur Rahman. After the assassination, Moslemuddin was given diplomatic posting along with the others involved in the coup. He was station at the Bangladesh consulate in Jedda and later the Bangladesh Embassy in Tehran.

Trial 
Criminal Investigations Department placed charges against Moslemuddin and 19 others on 15 January 1997 with the assassination of Sheikh Mujibur Rahman and his family members. Justice Kazi Golam Rasul of the District and Sessions Judge of Dhaka sentenced 15 of the accused to death on 8 November 1998. Following an appeal, Bangladesh High Court delivered a split verdict, Justice Md Ruhul Amin sentencing 10 to death and Justice A. B. M. Khairul Haque upheld the death sentence of all 15 accused. On 19 November 2009, Bangladesh Supreme Court sentenced 12 people to death in case. The convicts sentenced to death are Moslemuddin, A.K.M. Mohiuddin Ahmed, Abdul Aziz Pasha Syed Faruque Rahman, Sultan Shahriar Rashid Khan, Mohiuddin Ahmed, Mohammad Bazlul Huda, Shariful Haque Dalim, S.H.M.B Noor Chowdhury, Rashed Chowdhury, Abdul Majed.

In April 2020, several news outlets reported that Moslemuddin was arrested in West Bengal, following the arrest of Captain Abdul Majed. However, this was incorrect, because the Bangladesh government stated that they are still looking for Moslemuddin, as of 2021.

References

Assassination of Sheikh Mujibur Rahman
People convicted of murder by Bangladesh
Bangladesh Army officers